Forge Hill is an unincorporated community in Mineral County, West Virginia, United States. It is part of the Cumberland, MD-WV Metropolitan Statistical Area. Forge Hill lies to the northeast of the City of Keyser on a hill of the same name, overlooking the North Branch Potomac River.

References 

Unincorporated communities in Mineral County, West Virginia
Unincorporated communities in West Virginia
Populated places on the North Branch Potomac River